The Portuguese Cistern is a historic cistern in El Jadida, Morocco. It is located beneath the citadel at the heart of the historic Portuguese fortified city of Mazagan. It is a classified cultural heritage monument in Morocco and, along with the rest of the old walled city, forms part of a UNESCO World Heritage Site.

History 
The cistern was built beneath the Citadel, the original fort and first permanent structure that the Portuguese built on this site in 1514, before it was expanded into the larger walled fortress in 1541. The chamber's original function is not clear. It may have been an armory, barracks, or granary, but it is recorded as having been converted into a cistern in 1541. It was designed by an architect named Miguel de Arruda but the construction work was delegated to João de Castilho. The cistern has been used as a filming location for several movies, of which Orson Welles' Othello is the best known internationally.

Architecture 
The chamber is built in a late Gothic style known as Manueline. A round opening in the center of the chamber served to collect rainwater. 

The cistern is known today for the visual impression created by the thin layer of water covering the floor, which creates ever-changing reflections from the single shaft of light through the central hole in the ceiling.

Gallery

See also
Portuguese Empire

External links 

 Portuguese city (El Jadida).

References 

Former Portuguese colonies
World Heritage Sites in Morocco
El Jadida Province
Tourist attractions in Morocco